Potassium inwardly-rectifying channel, subfamily J, member 8, also known as KCNJ8, is a human gene encoding the Kir6.1 protein. A mutation in KCNJ8 has been associated with cardiac arrest in the early repolarization syndrome.

Potassium channels are present in most mammalian cells, where they participate in a wide range of physiologic responses. Kir6.1 is an integral membrane protein and inward-rectifier type potassium channel. Kir6.1, which has a greater tendency to allow potassium to flow into a cell rather than out of a cell, is controlled by G-proteins.

See also
 Inward-rectifier potassium ion channel

References

Further reading

External links 
 

Ion channels